In literary and historical analysis, presentism is a pejorative term for the introduction of present-day ideas and perspectives into depictions or interpretations of the past. Some modern historians seek to avoid presentism in their work because they consider it a form of cultural bias, and believe it creates a distorted understanding of their subject matter. The practice of presentism is regarded by some as a common fallacy when writing about the past.

The Oxford English Dictionary gives the first citation for presentism in its historiographic sense from 1916, and the word may have been used in this meaning as early as the 1870s. The historian David Hackett Fischer identifies presentism as a fallacy also known as the "fallacy of nunc pro tunc". He has written that the "classic example" of presentism was the so-called "Whig history", in which certain 18th- and 19th-century British historians wrote history in a way that used the past to validate their own political beliefs. This interpretation was presentist because it did not depict the past in objective historical context but instead viewed history only through the lens of contemporary Whig beliefs. In this kind of approach, which emphasizes the relevance of history to the present, things that do not seem relevant receive little attention, which results in a misleading portrayal of the past. "Whig history" or "whiggishness" are often used as synonyms for presentism particularly when the historical depiction in question is teleological or triumphalist.

Sociological analysis
Presentism has a shorter history in sociological analysis, where it has been used to describe technological determinists who interpret a change in behavior as starting with the introduction of a new technology. For example, scholars such as Frances Cairncross proclaimed that the Internet had led to "the death of distance", but most community ties and many business ties had been transcontinental and even intercontinental for many years.

Moral judgments
Presentism is also a factor in the problematic question of history and moral judgments. Among historians, the orthodox view may be that reading modern notions of morality into the past is to commit the error of presentism. To avoid this, historians restrict themselves to describing what happened and attempt to refrain from using language that passes judgment. For example, when writing history about slavery in an era when the practice was widely accepted, letting that fact influence judgment about a group or individual would be presentist and thus should be avoided.

Critics respond that avoidance of presentism on issues such as slavery amounts to endorsement of the views of dominant groups, in this case, slaveholders, as against those who opposed them at the time. Lawson argues:

Critics further respond that to avoid moral judgments is to practice moral relativism. Some religious historians argue that morality is timeless, having been established by God; they say it is not anachronistic to apply timeless standards to the past. (In this view, while mores may change, morality does not.)

Others argue that application of religious standards has varied over time as well. Augustine of Hippo, for example, holds that there exist timeless moral principles, but contends that certain practices (such as polygamy) were acceptable in the past because they were customary but now are neither customary nor acceptable.

Fischer, for his part, writes that while historians might not always manage to avoid the fallacy completely, they should at least try to be aware of their biases and write history in such a way that they do not create a distorted depiction of the past.

Wokeness
Conservative critics have portrayed a trend towards presentism in modern historical scholarship as reflective of a growing dominance of "woke" attitudes in wider society.

See also
Anachronism
Archaism
Chronological snobbery
Chronocentrism
Historian's fallacy
Moral high ground
Wikipedia:Recentism

References

Bibliography

1910s neologisms
Historiography
Informal fallacies
Whig history